The Maritime and Port Authority of Singapore (MPA) is a statutory board under the Ministry of Transport of the Government of Singapore.

History

The Maritime and Port Authority of Singapore (MPA) was established on 2 February 1996 by the MPA Act of 1996 through the merger of the Marine Department (which was under the then Ministry of Communications), National Maritime Board and the Regulatory departments of the former Port of Singapore Authority (PSA).  PSA was subsequently corporatised on 1 October 1997 and became known as PSA Corporation. In 2004, to further streamline all maritime-related functions, the industry promotion function for shipping was transferred from IE Singapore to MPA.

Role
As  Port Authority, MPA regulates and manages port and marine services, facilities and activities within the Singapore waters. This includes vessel traffic and navigational safety and security, through regulation on operational efficiency and on the environment.

As Developer and Promoter, MPA works with other government agencies and maritime industry partners to make Singapore a leading global hub port and a top international maritime centre.  Its aims include attracting a core group of shipowners and operators to set up operations in Singapore, broadening the breadth and depth of maritime ancillary services offered here, and improving on the business environment for the maritime industry.

As the National Sea Transport Representative, the MPA safeguards Singapore's maritime/port interests in the international arena.  This extends to being the Government's Advisor on matters relating to sea transport, and maritime/port services and facilities.

Singapore registry of ships
The Singapore Registry of Ships (SRS) was established in 1966. Today, Singapore is reputed for its quality Ship registry and is ranked among the world's top ten largest ship registries, with a fleet of more than 4,400 ships and tonnage of 96 million gross tons. SRS has also one of the youngest fleets among the top ten registries, with an average age of ten years.

The steady growth of the SRS attests to the effective administration and "quality flag" strategy that the MPA develops and promotes since its establishment. The SRS has grown steadily by about 8 per cent, from 18 million GT in 1996 to 43.7 million GT in 2008.

Initiatives

Tuas Port 
MPA is constructing a high-tech port in Tuas, Singapore, where PSA Singapore will be the sole operator. It is expected to be fully operational by 2040 and handle 65 million twenty-foot cargo units a year.

International Maritime Centre 
The International Maritime Centre (IMC) 2030 Advisory Committee, which comprises 22 business leaders and experts, was set up by MPA to chart the direction of Singapore as a maritime hub.

Artificial Intelligence 
MPA is partnering Fujitsu to test the Fujitsu Human Centric AI Zinrai system, which detects ship collision risks and predicts risk hotspots through artificial intelligence. This aimed to warn ships about potential collisions.

Governance 
The current chairman is Mr Niam Chiang Meng. The other 12 members of the board are:
 Mr Teo Eng Dih, Chief Executive, Maritime and Port Authority of Singapore
 RADM Aaron Beng, Chief of Navy, Republic of Singapore Navy
 Mr Abu Bakar Bin Mohd Nor, Group Chairman, Infofabrica Holdings Pte Ltd
 Mr Chan Cheow Hoe, Deputy Chief Executive, Government Technology Agency of Singapore and Government Chief Digital Technology Officer, Smart Nation and Digital Government Office
 Dr Vincent Lien, Director, Wah Hin & Company Pte Ltd
 Ms Mary Liew, President, NTUC Central Committee and General Secretary, Singapore Maritime Officers' Union
 Mr Jermaine Loy, Principal Private Secretary to Prime Minister, Prime Minister's Office
 Mr Chris Ong Leng Yeow, Chief Executive Officer & Managing Director (Offshore), Keppel Offshore & Marine
 Mr Esben Poulsson, Executive Chairman, Enesel Pte Ltd
 Mr Kevin Shum, Deputy Secretary (Strategy, Sustainability and Technology), Ministry of Transport
 Mr Sng Seow Wah, Corporate Advisor, Temasek International
 Mr Teo Choo Wee, Executive Director, Fleet Division Pacific International Lines (Pte) Ltd
 Ms Caroline Yang, President, Singapore Shipping Association
 Ms Patricia Yim

 Capt Chong Jia Chyuan, Port Master with effect from 1 November 2021.
 Capt Charles Alexandar De Souza, Deputy Port Master.
 Capt Shawn Hoe Yong Cheng, Deputy Port Master, with effect from 1 November 2021.

References

External links
 
 Singapore Registry of Ships (SRS) 50th Anniversary - a documentary about the history of SRS, produced by MPA Singapore

Statutory boards of the Singapore Government
1996 establishments in Singapore
Government agencies established in 1996
Singapore
Maritime safety
Regulation in Singapore